Max Gandolph von Kuenburg (also spelled Gandolf or Gandalf) was Prince-Archbishop of Salzburg from 1668 to 1687.

References

Sources
 
 

Roman Catholic archbishops of Salzburg
17th-century Austrian people